Delys Margaret Bird  is a Western Australian writer, academic and editor. She was editor of literary journal Westerly from 1993 to 2015 and has acted as editorial consultant since then.

Biography

Bird was born in Kalgoorlie, Western Australia. After living in Sydney for a period, Bird’s tertiary education began as a mature age student at the University of Western Australia in the 1970s. She began teaching at the university in 1980 and joined the faculty of Arts in 1985, where she was a member of the English Department as well as director of the Centre for Women’s Studies until her retirement in 2003.

Bird was editor of Western Australian literary journal Westerly from 1993 to 2015 and is currently editorial consultant to that publication. She had previously served as the journal's poetry editor. Bird has also conducted extensive research in Australian literature, with a focus on women writers and feminist theory.

Awards
In 2011, Bird was the recipient of the Association for the Study of Australian Literature’s A.A Philips award for her long period of excellence in the editing of Westerly. Bird was made a Member of the Order of Australia (AM) in the 2019 Queen's Birthday Honours in recognition of her "significant service to higher education, and to gender studies and literature".

Selected publications

Books

Journals 
Westerly (literary magazine), Editor 1990–present
  Pdf.

References

External links
http://www.uwa.edu.au/people/delys.bird
http://www.austlit.edu.au/austlit/page/A20660
https://web.archive.org/web/20140812205032/http://westerlymag.com.au/about/staff/

Australian non-fiction writers
Living people
Year of birth missing (living people)
Members of the Order of Australia
People from Kalgoorlie
Writers from Western Australia
University of Western Australia alumni
Academic staff of the University of Western Australia
20th-century Australian women writers
21st-century Australian women writers